The Acer beTouch E110 is a smartphone manufactured by Acer Inc. of Taiwan. The phone is based on the Android 1.5 operating system. It is focused on social networking, with features for integrating with Facebook, Twitter and other social networks.

The beTouch E110 was released on February 15, 2010. The smartphone is marketed as a budget Android-powered device. It lacks Wi-Fi capability.

Specifications

Hardware
The Acer beTouch E110 has a 2.8-inch TFT capacitive touchscreen display, ST Ericsson PNX6715 416 MHz CPU, 256 MB of RAM and 256 MB of internal storage that can be expanded using microSD card. The phone has a 1500 mAh Li-Ion battery, 3.5 MP rear camera with no selfie camera. It is available in Black and Dark Blue colors.

Software
Acer beTouch E110 ships with Android 1.5 (Cupcake).

Reception
The device received mixed reviews. The negativity in reviews involved the lack of connectivity to Wi-Fi and Android Market. Some said that the screen was not clear enough, and that the resistive touchscreen was poorly designed: users must press the screen firmly at times.

See also
Galaxy Nexus
List of Android devices

References

External links
Acer beTouch E110 Official Page

Android (operating system) devices
Mobile phones introduced in 2010
beTouch E110